Aldo Bufi Landi (7 April 1923 – 2 February 2016) was an Italian film actor. He appeared in more than 100 films between 1947 and 2013.

Selected filmography

 Malaspina (1947)
 Madunnella (1948)
 Assunta Spina (1948)
 Little Lady (1949)
 47 morto che parla (1950)
 Red Moon (1951)
 The Steamship Owner (1951)
 Perdonami! (1953)
 Submarine Attack (1954)
 Il Conte di Matera (1957)
 Tuppe tuppe, Marescià! (1958)
 Cavalier in Devil's Castle (1959)
 Desert Raiders (1964)
 Kidnapped to Mystery Island (1964)
 Sandokan Against the Leopard of Sarawak (1964)
 Secret Agent 777 (1965)
 Agent X-77 Orders to Kill (1966)
 Superargo and the Faceless Giants (1968)
The Million Dollar Countdown (1968)
 Midas Run (1969)
 Byleth: The Demon of Incest (1972)
 Sgarro alla camorra (1973)
 Super Stooges vs. the Wonder Women (1974)
The Unlikely Prince (2013)

References

External links

1923 births
2016 deaths
Italian male film actors
Male actors from Naples